Marcus Batista Belgrave (June 12, 1936 – May 24, 2015) was an American jazz trumpet player from Detroit, born in Chester, Pennsylvania. He recorded with numerous musicians from the 1950s onwards. Belgrave was inducted into the class of 2017 of the National Rhythm & Blues Hall of Fame in Detroit, Michigan.

Biography 
Belgrave was tutored by Clifford Brown before joining the Ray Charles touring band. Belgrave later worked with Motown Records, and recorded with Martha Reeves and the Vandellas, The Temptations, The Four Tops, Gunther Schuller, Carl Craig, Max Roach, Ella Fitzgerald, Charles Mingus, Tony Bennett, La Palabra, Sammy Davis Jr., Dizzy Gillespie, Odessa Harris and John Sinclair, plus more recently with his wife Joan Belgrave, among others.

Belgrave was an occasional faculty member at Stanford Jazz Workshop and a visiting professor of jazz trumpet at the Oberlin Conservatory.

Belgrave died on May 23, 2015, in Ann Arbor, Michigan, of heart failure, after being hospitalized since April with complications of chronic obstructive pulmonary disease and congestive heart failure.

Discography

As leader 
 Gemini II (Tribe Records, 1974; reissued Universal Sound, 2004).
 Working together (Detroit Jazz), 1992 (featuring Lawrence Williams)
 Live at Kerrytown Concert House (Detroit Jazz), 1995
 In the tradition (GHB) (featuring Doc Cheatham and Art Hodes)
 You don't know me – Tribute to New Orleans, Ray Charles and the Great Ladies of Song (DJMC), 2006 (featuring Joan Belgrave & Charlie Gabriel)
 Marcus, Charlie and Joan...Once again (DJMC), 2008

As sideman 
With Roland Alexander
Pleasure Bent (New Jazz, 1961)
With Geri Allen
Open on All Sides in the Middle (Minor Music, 1987)
The Nurturer (Blue Note, 1991)
Maroons (Blue Note, 1992)
The Life of a Song (Telarc, 2004)
Grand River Crossings (Motéma, 2013)
With Curtis Amy
Way Down (Pacific Jazz, 1962)
With Joan Belgrave
Excitable (Detroit Jazz Musicians Co-Op, 2009)
Merry Christmas Baby (Detroit Jazz Musicians Co-Op, 2014)
With Hank Crawford
Dig These Blues (Atlantic, 1966)
With George Gruntz
Theatre (ECM, 1983)
With Joe Henderson
Big Band (Verve, 1997)
With B.B. King
Let the Good Times Roll (1999)
With Kirk Lightsey
Kirk 'n Marcus (Criss Cross Jazz, 1987)
Lightsey to Gladden (Criss Cross Jazz 1306,1991)
With David Murray
Black & Black (1991)
With David "Fathead" Newman
Fathead (album) (Atlantic, 1960)
Fathead Comes On (Atlantic, 1962)
Resurgence! (Muse, 1981)
With Cecil Payne
Scotch and Milk (Delmark, 1997)
With Houston Person
The Real Thing (Eastbound, 1973)
With Horace Tapscott
Aiee! The Phantom (Arabesque, 1996)
With McCoy Tyner
La Leyenda de La Hora (Columbia, 1985)
With Wynton Marsalis and Jazz at Lincoln Center Orchestra
They Came To Swing (live) (Sony, 1994)

References

External links 

 Kresge Foundation Eminent Artist
 Marcus Belgrave website
 video biography

American jazz trumpeters
American male trumpeters
Crossover jazz trumpeters
Hard bop trumpeters
Post-bop trumpeters
American jazz educators
1936 births
2015 deaths
Jazz musicians from Michigan
Musicians from Detroit
Jazz musicians from Pennsylvania
People from Chester, Pennsylvania
Educators from Pennsylvania
Educators from Michigan
American male jazz musicians